Coveñas Airport  is a military airport serving the Caribbean coast town of Coveñas in the Sucre Department of Colombia. The runway is adjacent to the shore, and north departures and arrivals are over the Gulf of Morrosquillo.

Airlines and destinations

See also

Transport in Colombia
List of airports in Colombia

References

External links
OpenStreetMap - Coveñas
OurAirports - Coveñas
SkyVector - Coveñas
FallingRain - Coveñas Airport

Airports in Colombia